Barishal Zilla School, popularly known as BZS, is a public educational institution for boys, located in Barisal, Bangladesh. It was the first high school established in Barisal Division. It was founded as Barisal English School on 23 December 1829 by W. N. Garrett. It began with 27 students. In 1853, it was renamed Barisal Zilla School.

Notable alumni 

 A. K. Fazlul Huq, Prime Minister of Bengal (1937–1943)
 Khan Bahadur Hasem Ali Khan, Bengali nationalist and former minister of United Bengal
 Abdul Jabbar Khan, Speaker of the National Assembly of Pakistan (1965-1969)
 Abdur Rahman Biswas, President of Bangladesh (1991-1996)
 Altaf Mahmud, music composer
 Sardar Fazlul Karim, philosopher
 Buddhadeb Guha, writer
 Golam Mustafa, Ekushey Padak and National Film Award winning actor
 Manzoor Alam Beg, father of the fine art photography movement in Bangladesh, Alokchitracharya (the great teacher of photography), Ekushey Padak awardee
 Lieutenant General Hasan Mashhud Chowdhury, former chief of Army staff of Bangladesh
 Tapan Raychaudhuri, historian, Padma Bhushan awardee
 Promode Dasgupta, communist leader
 Tawfiq-e-Elahi Chowdhury, Bir Bikrom
 Hafizuddin Ahmed, Bir Bikrom
 Siraj Sikder, communist revolutionist

Gallery

See also
 List of Zilla Schools of Bangladesh

References

Boys' schools in Bangladesh
High schools in Bangladesh
Schools in Barisal District
Educational institutions established in 1829